St. John's Church, Oakfield, Ryde is a parish church in the Church of England located in Ryde, Isle of Wight.

History

The church was built in 1842-43 by Charles Langdon & Co. to a design by the architect Thomas Hellyer.

The church was consecrated on 18 July 1843 by Charles Richard Sumner the Bishop of Winchester. Successive enlargements to the building were made in following years as the local population grew, and on 3 December 1870 the enlarged church was re-consecrated. At the same time St John's became a parish church, until that time having been a chapel-of-ease in the parish of St Helens.

A Lady chapel was added in 1914 in memory of the 7th Lord Calthorpe whose family lived at nearby Woodlands Vale, and were regular worshippers at the church. The chancel of the church was enlarged in 1954.

The churchyard contains Commonwealth war graves of 13 service personnel from World War I and two from World War II.

In 1970 a church hall was added as an extension of the church building, the previous hall having been situated some distance away at the junction of St John's Hill and St John's Avenue. The church hall was refurbished in 2006 and was used for a number of years as The Park Centre, a community resource. Management of the hall has now returned to the PCC of St John's Church and continues to be used by church and community groups.

Organ

A specification of the organ can be found on the National Pipe Organ Register.

List of organists

J. Heaton-Bailey 1886 - 1890
Walter Brennand Smith ????
Sidney L. Torr 1910 - ca. 1912 - ????
R. H. Toogood. ca. 1921
Dudley Teague ca. 1967
Jeanette Richards ca. 1980

References

Church of England church buildings on the Isle of Wight
Grade II listed churches on the Isle of Wight
Ryde